Lansdowne is a neighborhood in southeast Lexington, Kentucky, United States. Its boundaries are Tates Creek Road to the east, New Circle Road to the south, and its western border is a combination of Belvoir Dr / Malabu Dr, Larkin Rd, Heather Way, and Melbourne Way.

Neighborhood statistics

 Area: 
 Population: 2,406
 Population density: 1,952 people per square mile
 Median household income (2010): $56,026

References

Neighborhoods in Lexington, Kentucky